Nijmegen Lent is a railway station located in Lent, just north of Nijmegen, Netherlands. The station was opened on 1 June 2002 and is located on the Arnhem–Nijmegen railway. The train services are operated by Nederlandse Spoorwegen.

The station opened in 2002 was actually a temporary station for 11 years. On 25 July 2013 the new, permanent, station was opened which features lifts. This station is located 250m further south than the temporary station.

History
The first station of Lent opened in 1882 and was closed in 1934 because there were too few passengers. During World War II, the station was opened again twice, in 1940 and 1941 and when the bridge into Nijmegen was blown up, this was the terminating station for trains from Arnhem temporarily.

The station was reopened on 1 June 2002 as part of the Waalsprong development of Nijmegen.

Train services
, the following train services call at this station:
Local services:
Sprinter: 's-Hertogenbosch - Nijmegen - Arnhem
Sprinter: (Wijchen -) Nijmegen - Arnhem - Zutphen

Bus services

13: Lent - Nijmegen station - Heyendaal - University - Wilhelmina Hospital - Dukenburg - Bijsterhuizen - Wijchen
14: Arnhem - Elst - Nijmegen
15: Lent - Nijmegen station - Heyendaal - University - Wilhelmina Hospital - Dukenburg - Wijchen
33: Arnhem - Huissen - Angeren - Doornenburg - Gendt - Bemmel - Nijmegen
300: Arnhem - Huissen - Bemmel - Nijmegen
331: Arnhem - Elst - Nijmegen
N30: Arnhem - Huissen - Bemmel - Nijmegen (Night bus)
N31: Arnhem - Elst - Nijmegen (Night bus)

External links
NS website 
Dutch Public Transport journey planner 

Lent
Railway stations opened in 1882
Railway stations opened in 2002
2002 establishments in the Netherlands
Railway stations in the Netherlands opened in the 21st century